Sandlings Forest is a 2,483.8 hectare biological Site of Special Scientific Interest in two large blocks, Rendlesham Forest and Tunstall Forest, and two small ones, between Woodbridge and Aldeburgh in Suffolk. It is partly in the Sandlings Special Protection Area under the European Union Directive on the Conservation of Wild Birds. It is in the Suffolk Coast and Heaths Area of Outstanding Natural Beauty.

These commercial coniferous plantations are designated an SSSI for their internationally important bird populations. Surveys in the 1990s found 81 singing nightjars, around 2% of the number in Britain, and 71 woodlarks, approximately 5% of the British population.

There are public footpaths through the woods.

References

Sites of Special Scientific Interest in Suffolk